Paradonghicola is a Gram-negative and aerobic genus of bacteria from the family of Rhodobacteraceae with one known species (Paradonghicola geojensis). Paradonghicola geojensis has been isolated from seawater from Geoje-si in Korea.

References

Rhodobacteraceae
Bacteria genera
Monotypic bacteria genera